is a city located in Chiba Prefecture, Japan. It is the Greater Tokyo Area's 7th most populated city (after passing Kawaguchi, Hachioji and Chiba), and second largest in Chiba Prefecture.

Geography
Funabashi is located in northwestern Chiba Prefecture approximately 20 kilometers in either direction from the prefectural capital at Chiba and downtown Tokyo. The central area forms a flat diluvial upland of the Shimōsa Plateau. The city sits at an elevation of 20 to 30 meters above sea level, and is relatively flat. The highest point is 32.3 meters in Narashino 3-chome, and the lowest point is 0.2 meters in Minatomachi 1-chome. Funabashi is crossed by the Tone River, and the small Ebi River is located entirely within city limits. Funabashi formerly had wide, shallow beaches, but much of the coast has been industrialized and transformed by reclaimed land. The city extends for 13.86 kilometers east–west and 14.95 kilometers north–south.

Neighboring municipalities
Chiba Prefecture
Ichikawa
Narashino
Yachiyo
Kamagaya
Shiroi

Climate
Funabashi has a humid subtropical climate (Köppen Cfa) characterized by warm summers and cool winters with light to no snowfall.

Demographics
Per Japanese census data, the population of Funabashi has increased rapidly over the past century.

History
The name "Funabashi" is mentioned in the Kamakura period chronicle Azuma Kagami. However, the name itself is even more ancient, dating from before the Nara period and the Yamatotakeru mythology. Archaeologists have found stone tools from the Japanese Paleolithic period and shell middens from the Jōmon period in the area, indicating continuous inhabitation for thousands of years. A number of Shinto shrines and Buddhist temples in the area claim to have been founded in the Nara period or Heian period. During the Muromachi periods, the area was controlled by the Chiba clan. During the Sengoku period, the Chiba clan fought the Satomi clan to the south, and the Late Hōjō clan to the west. After the defeat of the Chiba clan, the area came within the control of Tokugawa Ieyasu.

Under the Tokugawa shogunate, the area prospered as a post town on the river crossing of the Tone River, and was largely retained as tenryō under the direct control of the Shogunate and administered through a number of hatamoto. The area was also a favored hunting grounds for the Shōgun. During the Boshin War of the Meiji Restoration, Funabashi was the location of a minor skirmish between Tokugawa loyalists under Enomoto Takeaki and the pro-Imperial forces of  Okayama Domain and Satsuma Domain, during which most of the town burned down.

After the abolition of the han system, the area eventually became part of Chiba Prefecture. Funabashi Town was one of several towns and villages created on April 1, 1889, under Inba District with the establishment of the modern municipalities system. The area developed rapidly due to its proximity to Tokyo and the presence of numerous military facilities in the area. On April 1, 1937, Funabashi was elevated to city status through merger with neighboring Katsushika Town and Yasakae, Hoden and Tsukada Villages. The new city was host to numerous military installations in World War II, and was bombed in the air raids on Japan in 1945.

The city developed rapidly in the postwar period, with the development of industries, public housing developments and port facilities.  With the annexation of neighboring Ninomiya Town in 1953, the population exceeded 100,000. The population exceeded 300,000 in 1969 and 500,000 in 1982. Funabashi was designated a core city on April 1, 2005, with increased local autonomy from the central government. The population exceeded 600,000 in 2006.

Government
Funabashi has a mayor-council form of government with a directly elected mayor and a unicameral city council of 50 members. Funabashi contributes seven members to the Chiba Prefectural Assembly. In terms of national politics, the city is divided between the Chiba 4th district and the Chiba 13th districtof the lower house of the Diet of Japan.

Economy
Funabashi is a regional commercial center and, due to its numerous train connections, a bedroom community for nearby Chiba and Tokyo. Approximately 34.5% of the working population commutes to Tokyo, per the 2015 census.

Companies from Funabashi 
 Mugen Seiki - a remote control car manufacturer

Education
Nihon University branch campus
 Funabashi has 54 public elementary schools and 27 public middle schools operated by the city government, and 11 public high schools operated by the Chiba Prefectural Board of Education. There are also one private elementary school, one private middle school and four private high schools. The prefecture also operates one special education school for the handicapped.

Transportation

Railway
 JR East –  Musashino Line
   - 
 JR East –  Keiyō Line
   ->>- 
 JR East –  Chūō-Sōbu Line
  -  -  - 
 Keisei Electric Railway -  Keisei Main Line
  -  -  -  -  -  - 
  Shin-Keisei Electric Railway -  Shin-Keisei Line
  -  -  - -  -  - -  - 
 Hokusō Railway -Hokusō Line
 
 Tobu Railway  – Tobu Noda Line
  -  -  - 
 Tōyō Rapid Railway - Tōyō Rapid Line
  -  -  -  - 
Tokyo Metro Tōzai Line
  -

Highway

Sister city relations
 – Hayward, California, United States, from November 7, 1986
 – Odense, Denmark from April 6, 1989
 – Xi'an, Shaanxi, China from November 2, 1994

Local attractions

Notable structures 
Funabashi Racecourse
Funabashi Sports Park Arena, playground of the Chiba Jets
Nakayama Racecourse
LaLaPort shopping mall, one of the largest in Japan
SSAWS indoor ski slope (closed and demolished in 2003)
Japan's first large-format IKEA store, built on the site of SSAWS

Notable places　
Funabashi Shrine
Ninomiya Jinja
Narashinohara
Kūtei-kan
Meiji Tennō Chūhitsu no Tokoro no Hi
Gyōda Musen
Cherry blossoms on the Ebi River
Nishonoseki stable

Notable people from Funabashi
Funassyi, unofficial city mascot
Hiroki Aiba, dancer and singer
Kazuyuki Fujita, professional wrestler
Sayaka Ichii, musician
Atsushi Itō, actor
Yuko Kavaguti, figure skater
Mai Kuraki, singer
Fumie Kurotori, swimmer
Mai Minokoshi, professional tennis player
Manabu Namiki, video game designer
Yoshihiro Natsuka, professional soccer player
Katsuhiko Nishijima, Anime director
Michiko Nishiwaki, actress, stunt woman
Yoshihiko Noda, politician, former Prime Minister of Japan
Hanako Oku, musician
Shunzo Ono, professional soccer player
Tamao Satō, actress
Takashi Sekizuka, professional soccer player
Mariko Shiga, musician
Rin Takanashi, film and television actress
Keiko Terada, singer (Show-Ya)
Akeno Watanabe, voice actress
Azusa Yamamoto, gravure idol
Tomohisa Yamashita, musician
Risa Yoshiki, model, actress, singer
Arisa Hoshiki, Former professional wrestler, singer under the alter ego Udon Sato
Minori Matsushima, voice Actress

Eponym 
 In 2018, asteroid 25892 Funabashi was named for the city

References

External links

Official Website 

 
Cities in Chiba Prefecture